SS Haiti Victory (T-AGM-238) was originally built and operated as Greenville class cargo Victory ship which operated as a cargo carrier in both the Atlantic Ocean and the Pacific Ocean during World War II .

In 1960 she was renamed USNS Longview (T-AGM-3)  and converted to use as a missile tracking ship which operated in the Pacific Ocean Western Test Range until she was placed out of service and eventually disposed of.

Construction
Haiti Victory (T-AK 238) was laid down under U.S. Maritime Commission contract by Permanente Metals Corporation, Richmond, California, 24 April 1944, under the Emergency Shipbuilding program. She was launched on 20 July. She was sponsored by Mrs. Lucius Booner; and delivered to the War Shipping Administration (WSA) on 18 September.

World War II commercial operation
The ship's United States Maritime Commission designation was VC2- S- AP3. During World War II she operated as a merchantman and was chartered to Waterman Steamship Company.

Acquired by the Navy as a cargo carrier
Acquired by the Navy 1 March 1950, Haiti Victory was assigned to the Military Sea Transportation Service (MSTS), for cargo operations in the Atlantic Ocean. From 1950 to 1957, sailing from New York City, she made cargo runs to Northern Europe, the Mediterranean, and the Caribbean. On 6 May 1953, she collided with the British ferry Duke of York, shearing off the ferry's bow, and resulting in the deaths of six passengers.
 
On 15 June 1957, Haiti Victory sailed on her first MSTS cruise to the Pacific Ocean. Steaming via the U.S. West Coast, the veteran cargo ship arrived Pusan, Korea, 1 August. Following several Far East cruises, she resumed operations in the Atlantic in July 1958. Departing New York 11 July she steamed for the Eastern Mediterranean to support United States peacekeeping efforts in Lebanon. Units of the U.S. 6th Fleet had landed U.S. Marines at request of Lebanese President Chamoun who wished to prevent a coup against his regime by communist oriented insurgents.
 
While operating in the Mideast, she twice steamed through the Suez Canal, for cargo runs to Karachi, Pakistan. Returning to New York 3 January 1959, Haiti Victory made another Mediterranean cruise prior to assignment in the Pacific. Arriving San Francisco, California, 4 April she operated off the West Coast until sailing for Hawaii 3 months later.

Conversion to missile support 

Arriving Pearl Harbor 3 July, she underwent conversion and training for a role in America's young space program.

Haiti Victory found a place in history, when she became the first ship to recover a space vehicle from orbit. On 11 August 1960, her helicopter retrieved a 300-pound capsule that was launched into orbit the previous day by a Thor-Agena rocket as part of the Central Intelligence Agency's Corona spy satellite project.

Haiti Victory was renamed Longview and re-classified T-AGM-3 on 27 November 1960. She continued operations in the Pacific Missile Range supporting the United States space program, performing a variety of scientific duties for the U.S. Air Force Western Test Range.

The Longview was lead ship in the new class, Longview-class missile range instrumentation ship, two other ships followed in this new class the USNS Private Joe E. Mann (T-AK-253) and the USNS Dalton Victory (T-AK-256).

Final disposition
Longview was transferred to the U.S. Maritime Administration (MARAD) for lay up in the National Defense Reserve Fleet, and on 27 April 1976 was sold for scrapping to American Ship Dismantlers.

Honors
She earned the National Defense Service Medal for the Korean War.

See also 
 Missile Range Instrumentation Ship
 List of Victory ships
 Liberty ship
 Type C1 ship
 Type C2 ship
 Type C3 ship
 USNS Dalton Victory (T-AK-256)

References

  
 NavSource Online: Service Ship Photo Archive – T-AK-238 Haiti Victory – T- AGM-3 Longview

 

Victory ships
Ships built in Richmond, California
1944 ships
World War II merchant ships of the United States
Ships of the United States Army
Greenville Victory-class cargo ships
Missile range instrumentation ships of the United States Navy
Longview-class missile range instrumentation ships
Cold War auxiliary ships of the United States
Maritime incidents in 1953
Maritime vessels related to spaceflight